Bützow Castle is a castle in Bützow, Germany.

The castle is built on the foundations of a Slav fortress, and served as the residential castle of the bishops of Schwerin. It was transformed into a Renaissance castle by Duke Ulrich of Mecklenburg in 1556.

References

External links
Official site (in German)

Castles in Mecklenburg-Western Pomerania